Horace C. Young (August 28, 1806 – May 19, 1879) was an American architect and politician from New York.

Life
He was the son of Henry Young (1775–1852) and Philany (Kellogg) Young (1783-1865). He was born in that part of the Town of Smithfield which was separated in 1823 as the Town of Fenner, in Madison County, New York. He became a builder and architect. On January 19, 1831, he married Laura P. Walker (1808–1890), and they had six children, among them Congressman H. Olin Young (1850–1917).

In May 1832, the couple removed to New Albion, in Cattaraugus County. He was elected a Justice of the Peace in 1834; and was Supervisor of New Albion in 1843, and from 1845 to 1848. He drew the plans for the first Minnesota State Capitol which burned down in 1881.

He was a member of the New York State Assembly (Cattaraugus Co., 2nd D.) in 1849 and 1850; and of the New York State Senate (32nd D.) in 1862 and 1863.

Sources
The New York Civil List compiled by Franklin Benjamin Hough, Stephen C. Hutchins and Edgar Albert Werner (1870; pg. 443, 466 and 468)
Biographical Sketches of the State Officers and the Members of the Legislature of the State of New York in 1862 and '63 by William D. Murphy (1863; pg. 120ff)
History of New Albion transcribed from Historical Gazetteer and Biographical Memorial of Cattaraugus Co. NY by William Adams (1893), at Painted Hills

1806 births
1879 deaths
New York (state) state senators
New York (state) Republicans
People from Cattaraugus County, New York
People from Smithfield, New York
New York (state) Whigs
19th-century American politicians
Members of the New York State Assembly
Town supervisors in New York (state)